Ashura no Gotoku may refer to:
 Ashura no Gotoku (TV series), a 1979 Japanese drama series
 Like Asura, or Ashura no Gotoku, a 2003 Japanese film, a remake of the TV series